Bective Abbey is a Cistercian abbey on the River Boyne in Bective, County Meath, Ireland.

The abbey was founded in 1147, and the remaining (well-preserved) structure and ruins primarily date to the 15th century. The site, including a nearby car park, were purchased by the state in 2012, and are managed by the Office of Public Works. The abbey, including its early 13th century church, 15th century cloister, and 16th century tower, is a protected structure and recorded on the register of National monuments of Ireland.

History
The abbey was founded in 1147 by Murchad O'Maeil-Sheachlainn, as a 'daughter house' of Mellifont Abbey. The abbey and its estate lands were confiscated during the Dissolution of the Monasteries in the 1530s, before being rented to Thomas Asgarde, and later purchased by Andrew Wyse in 1552. Around this time the estate lands were surveyed, and recorded at 1580 acres. During the 17th century, the abbey buildings were partially converted for use as a manor house.

The site was taken into state care, and named a protected structure and National Monument. Bective Abbey was subject to a number of excavations in the early 21st century, and made more accessible to visitors around this time.

In popular culture
Bective Abbey was used as a location during the shooting of the 1995 historical action-drama movie Braveheart.

Gallery

References

See also 

 List of abbeys and priories in Ireland, (County Meath)

Buildings and structures in County Meath
Cistercian monasteries in the Republic of Ireland
Ruins in the Republic of Ireland
Religion in County Meath
1147 establishments in Ireland
Religious organizations established in the 1140s
Christian monasteries established in the 12th century
National Monuments in County Meath